William Machado de Oliveira (born 24 August 1976), known as William Machado or simply William, is a Brazilian retired footballer who played as a central defender.

Playing career

Early career
Born in Belo Horizonte, Minas Gerais, William started his career with hometown amateurs Sete de Setembro. After a short spell with Desportiva Capixaba, he signed for Ipatinga in 1999, and was a regular starter for the club until joining Cabofriense in 2001.

In 2002, William returned to his native state after agreeing to a contract with América Mineiro, a club he already represented as a youth. He failed to settle into any team in the following campaigns, representing Francana, Portuguesa and Joinville before suffering a serious injury in 2004.

In 2005 William returned to Ipatinga, and subsequently became an undisputed starter for the side.

Grêmio
On 1 April 2006, William was presented at Grêmio.

Corinthians
In 2007, after the arrival of Mano Menezes to Corinthians and the demand of time for players to form their defensive sector, William, who had worked and had credibility with Mano Menezes ended up being requested by the coach and hired by Corinthians. He was hired for a period of 6 months with possibility of extension, which was later made. With the departure of Betão to Santos, William was chosen as team captain. With the Timão he was runner-up on the Brazil Cup in 2008. On November 8, 2008 he won the Campeonato Brasileiro Série B with Corinthians. In 2009 they won the Campeonato Paulista (undefeated), and the Copa do Brasil. In 2010, the captain led a campaign in conjunction with the then sponsor of the club, to help the people who suffered from the earthquake in Haiti.

Honours
Ipatinga
Campeonato Mineiro: 2005

Grêmio
Campeonato Gaúcho: 2006, 2007

Corinthians
Campeonato Brasileiro Série B: 2008
Campeonato Paulista: 2009
Copa do Brasil: 2009

References

External links

1976 births
Living people
Footballers from Belo Horizonte
Brazilian footballers
Association football defenders
Campeonato Brasileiro Série A players
Campeonato Brasileiro Série B players
Desportiva Ferroviária players
Ipatinga Futebol Clube players
Associação Desportiva Cabofriense players
América Futebol Clube (MG) players
Associação Portuguesa de Desportos players
Joinville Esporte Clube players
Grêmio Foot-Ball Porto Alegrense players
Sport Club Corinthians Paulista players